Edmond Bailly was a Swiss footballer. He competed in the men's tournament at the 1928 Summer Olympics.

References

External links
 

Year of birth missing
Year of death missing
Swiss men's footballers
Switzerland international footballers
Olympic footballers of Switzerland
Footballers at the 1928 Summer Olympics
Place of birth missing
Association football forwards